Benjamin Castleman (May 17, 1906, Everett, Massachusetts – June 29, 1982, Boston, Massachusetts) was an American physician and pathologist best known for describing Castleman's disease (angiofollicular lymphoid hyperplasia), which is named after him. He was also one of the authors of the first case series on pulmonary alveolar proteinosis in a 1958 article in the New England Journal of Medicine. ("Rosen–Castleman–Liebow syndrome" is a rarely used term for that condition.)  Castleman undertook clinicopathologic investigations of parathyroid disease and wrote several important papers on diseases of the thymus and mediastinum. He wrote, or collaborated in writing, over 100 scholarly papers on a variety of disorders.

Castleman grew up in a Jewish religious household and was educated at Harvard University (B.A., 1927) and Yale University (M.D., 1931).  He worked for many years at the Massachusetts General Hospital in Boston, serving as chief of the division of anatomic pathology there, and he held the rank of Professor of Pathology in the Harvard Medical School. Castleman was an editor of the clinicopathological case presentation series in the New England Journal of Medicine.

The Benjamin Castleman Award has been given annually since 1982 to the first author of an English-language research article that is considered the most worthy in the field of human pathology. It is administered by the United States and Canadian Academy of Pathology.

Castleman died of lymphoma in June 1982 and is buried in Boston, MA.

See also
 Pathology
 List of pathologists

Footnotes

American pathologists
1906 births
1982 deaths
People from Everett, Massachusetts
Physicians of Massachusetts General Hospital
Harvard University alumni
Yale School of Medicine alumni